Alliance for Democracy and Progress may refer to:

Alliance for Democracy and Progress (Benin)
Alliance for Democracy and Progress (Central African Republic)
Alliance for Democracy and Progress (Mali)